William A. Russell (after 1820 – before 1897) was an American politician from New York.

He was the son of Congressman David Abel Russell and Alida (Lansing) Russell.

He was Sheriff of Washington County from 1850 to 1852.

He was an Inspector of State Prisons from 1856 to 1858, elected on the American ticket in 1855 but defeated for re-election in 1858.

Union General David Allen Russell was his brother.

Sources
DEATH LIST OF A DAY in NYT on May 25, 1897, his son's (also named William A. Russell) obit
Harper's Magazine telling an anecdote of Russell's trip south to take up his duties at the State Prison
The New York Civil List compiled by Franklin Benjamin Hough (pages 46 and 409; Weed, Parsons and Co., 1858)

Year of death missing
Place of birth missing
Place of death missing
People from Washington County, New York
New York State Prison Inspectors
New York (state) sheriffs
New York (state) Know Nothings
19th-century American politicians
Year of birth uncertain